

State Legislative Assemblies

State Legislative Council

See also
 List of current Indian opposition leaders
 Official Opposition

References

Governing and opposition parties